Ghesquierellana hirtusalis is a moth in the family Crambidae. It was described by Francis Walker in 1859. It is found on the Comoros (Mohéli) and in the Democratic Republic of the Congo (Orientale, North Kivu, Equateur), Ethiopia, Réunion, Madagascar, Sierra Leone, South Africa, Zimbabwe, and Mali.

The larvae feed on the fruits of Ficus species, including Ficus mucoso, Ficus vallis-choudae and Ficus mauritiana.

References

Moths described in 1859
Spilomelinae